Muara Enim Regency is a regency of South Sumatra Province, Indonesia. The regency seat is the town of Muara Enim. The city of Prabumulih is an administrative body separating the main part of Muara Enim to the south of the city from a smaller part to its north. The regency until 2012 covered an area of 8,587.94 km² and had a population of 717,717 at the 2010 Census; however, in December 2012 five districts of the Muara Enim Regency split off to form the new Penukal Abab Lematang Ilir Regency. 

The residual regency now covers 7,486.21 km2 and within its reduced area had a population of 551,202 at the 2010 Census and 612,900 at the 2020 Census, the latter comprising 312,953 males and 299,947 females.

Mining and agricultural activities are abundant in the regency and it is also a producer of oil. Notable crops include rice and coconuts.

Turn of year 2023 split off Kabupaten Rambang Lubai Lematang taking with it 6 kecamatan, (Lubai, Lubai Ulu, Rambang, Rambang Niru, 4 Empat Petulai Dangku/EPD, Belimbing), 70 Desa with 2307,9 km2, BPS 2020  182,703 people.

Location 
Bumi Serasan Sekundang is located in the heart of South Sumatra Province. The boundaries are:

Administrative Districts
Muara Enim Regency was divided as at 2010 into twenty-two districts (kecamatan); however five of these districts (Talang Ubi, Penukal, Tanah Abang, Penukal Utara and Abab) were separated out from this Regency in 2013 to form the new Penukal Abab Lematang Ilir Regency. However, four additional districts (Panang Enim, Lubai Ulu, Belimbing and Belida Darat) have subsequently been created by the division of existing districts, while the former Rambang Dangku has been split into two new districts (Rambang Nuru and Empat Petulai Dangku). The resulting twenty-two districts, which are sub-divided into 255 administrative villages (rural desa and urban kelurahan), are listed below with their areas and their populations at the 2010 Census and the 2020 Census. The table also includes the locations of the district administrative centres, together with the number of villages (rural desa and urban kelurahan) in each and their post code(s). The topography of the regency comprised a southern group of five districts with an altitude of over 100 metres above sea level in the Bukit Barisan mountain chain, a central group of eleven districts, and a northern group of six districts of mainly swamp area facing directly with the Musi River basin, which (since the creation of the Penukal Abab Lematang Ilir Regency in 2013) are physically separated from the rest of the Muara Enim Regency by the city of Prabumulih.

Notes: (a) the 2010 population of the new Panang Enim District was included in the 2010 total for Tanjung Agung District, from which it was cut out. (b) the 2010 population of the new Lubai Ulu District was included in the 2010 total for Lubai District, from which it was cut out. (c) the 2010 population of the new Belimbing District was included in the 2010 total for Gunung Megang District, from which it was cut out. (d) the 2010 populations of the new Rambang Niru and Empat Petulai Dangku Districts are included in the figure of 50,455 which was the total of the former Rambang Dangku District, which was divided to form the new districts.  (e) the 2010 population of the new Belide Darat District was included in the 2010 total for Lembak District, from which it was cut out.

References

Regencies of South Sumatra